Streptomyces sanglieri is a bacterium species from the genus of Streptomyces which has been isolated from soil from a hay 
meadow. Streptomyces sanglieri produces the antibiotic lactonamycin Z.

Further reading

See also 
 List of Streptomyces species

References

External links
Type strain of Streptomyces sanglieri at BacDive -  the Bacterial Diversity Metadatabase	

sanglieri
Bacteria described in 2003